Chavs may refer to:
Chav, a British pejorative denoting class stereotype
Chavs: The Demonization of the Working Class, a 2011 book by British writer Owen Jones
The Chavs, British musical group